Barentu Subregion is a subregion in the Gash-Barka region of western Eritrea. The capital lies at Barentu.

Towns and villages
Barentu
Tauda 
Alegada 
Dedda 
Augana 
Cona 
Daghilo

References

External links
 Subregions of Eritrea
 Awate.com: Martyr Statistics

Gash-Barka Region
Subregions of Eritrea